Michelle Anne Rowland (born 16 November 1971) is an Australian politician. She is a member of the Australian Labor Party (ALP) and has represented the Division of Greenway in the House of Representatives since 2010. She was a member of the shadow ministry from 2013 to 2022, and was elected President of the Australian Labor Party (NSW Branch) in October 2021. She is now the Minister for Communications in the government of Anthony Albanese following the ALP's victory in the 2022 Australian federal election.

Early years and background
Rowland was born in Blacktown in Sydney. Her mother is Fijian, but she does not hold dual citizenship as the Fijian constitution at the time did not allow for citizenship to pass through the maternal line. She was raised in Seven Hills. She was educated at Our Lady of Mercy College, Parramatta and the University of Sydney. Rowland was a senior telecommunications lawyer with law firm Gilbert + Tobin in Sydney. She lives in the electorate at Glenwood. Rowland was a Director of the Western Sydney Area Health Service from 2000 to 2004 and is a former local councillor (Ward 2, 2004–2008) and deputy mayor of Blacktown (2007–2008).

Federal politics
At the 2010 Australian federal election, Rowland won the Australian House of Representatives seat of Greenway for Labor, following the 2009 electoral distribution which had made Greenway notionally Labor, on a margin of 5.7 points. The seat was previously held by Liberal Louise Markus, who contested the more marginal seat of Macquarie at the 2010 federal election. Rowland was re-elected to the seat at the 2013 federal election with an increased majority, and was also subsequently appointed to the Labor opposition's frontbench as Shadow Assistant Minister for Communications as well as Shadow Minister for Citizenship and Multiculturalism. In October 2015, Rowland was elevated to Shadow Minister for Small Business as well as continuing as Shadow Minister for Citizenship and Multiculturalism.

In the lead-up to the 2013 federal election, campaign opinion polls had shown that she would lose Greenway. However, her subsequent victory was helped during the campaign by the high profile blunder of the Liberal Party candidate Jaymes Diaz, when he could not state clearly the Coalition's policy on asylum seekers.

Shadow minister
Following the ALP's defeat at the 2013 election, Rowland was appointed to Bill Shorten's Shadow Ministry. Rowland has held the portfolios of Shadow Assistant Minister for Communications (2013–2015), Shadow Minister for Citizenship and Multiculturalism (2013–2016), Shadow Minister for Small Business (2015–2016), and Shadow Minister for Communications (2016–2019). She was elevated to the shadow Cabinet in 2016, and maintained her place following Anthony Albanese's election as party leader in 2019.

Rowland was elected President of the Australian Labor Party (NSW Branch) at the NSW State Conference on 9 October 2021.

Political positions
Rowland is a member of Labor Right. 

In 2012, Rowland was one of 98 MPs that voted against a bill for same-sex marriage, but supported its introduction from 2016. Despite the 2017 Australian Marriage Law postal survey returning a 53.6% no vote for her electorate of Greenway, Rowland voted for the bill that enacted same-sex marriage in Australia. This was in line with her longstanding position and the national success of the Yes vote, with Rowland declaring: "Personally, a conversation I had with a mother in Seven Hills provided me with an important perspective. Her son is on active service in the Australian navy and he wants to marry his partner. This man is putting his life on the line in service to Australia. Who am I, and who is any person, to say that this man should not be entitled to marry the person he loves?".

In 2021, Rowland was the most vocal critic inside the Labor caucus of its capital gains tax, negative gearing, and income tax policies, seeing all three dropped.

References

External links
 Michelle Rowland MP
 Parliament of Australia – Ms Michelle Rowland MP

 

1971 births
Living people
Australian Labor Party members of the Parliament of Australia
Labor Right politicians
Members of the Australian House of Representatives
Members of the Australian House of Representatives for Greenway
Women members of the Australian House of Representatives
20th-century Australian lawyers
Australian solicitors
Australian women lawyers
Sydney Law School alumni
Australian people of Fijian descent
Lawyers from Sydney
Politicians from Sydney
21st-century Australian politicians
21st-century Australian women politicians
Australian Labor Party councillors
Deputy mayors of places in Australia
21st-century women lawyers
Albanese Government